Ketchikan High School, often referred to as Kayhi, is the principal high school for the Southeast Alaska community of Ketchikan and the Ketchikan Gateway Borough School District.

See also

 List of high schools in Alaska

References

External links
 
 Ketchikan Gateway Borough School District official website

1946 establishments in Alaska
Educational institutions established in 1946
Ketchikan, Alaska
Public high schools in Alaska
Schools in Ketchikan Gateway Borough, Alaska